Esfandiar Maasoumi (born March 5, 1950) is an econometrician and an economist. He is a Distinguished Professor at Emory University. He received his bachelor's and master's degrees from the London School of Economics. He earned his Ph.D.in 1977, also from the London School of Economics. He is fellow of the Royal Statistical Society, a Fellow of the American Statistical Association, and a fellow of the Journal of Econometrics. He is ranked in the Econometricians Hall of Fame. Maasoumi has served as Editor of Econometric Reviews since 1987. He has influential contributions in forecasting, specification analysis, information theory, multidimensional welfare/wellbeing, mobility and inequality.  He has published more than 100 articles and reviews in the leading journals in economics.

Selected publications

References 

Econometricians
Living people
1950 births
Fellows of the American Statistical Association